The Next Wave: Using Digital Technology to Further Social and Political Innovation is a 2011 book which is written by Darrell M. West, who is an author and political scientist, now Director of the Brookings Institution. This book is composed in 9 chapters and topic is a social change with innovation in digital technology. Author argued that how changes of nation, society and private which is derived from increase in efficiency are going to be, when technology is combined with many parts of government, policies and society, and how we maximize effects of those changes.

bibliography
 The Next Wave: Using Digital Technology to Further Social and Political Innovation

2011 non-fiction books
Books about the Digital Revolution
Digital technology